Rajendra Singh Tomar (29 January 1922 – 14 July 2003 ), popularly called Rajju Bhaiya, was the fourth Sarsanghchalak of the Rashtriya Swayamsevak Sangh (RSS). He was chief of that organisation between 1994 and 2000.

Rajju Bhaiya worked as a professor and head of the Department of Physics at University of Allahabad but left the job to devote his life to the RSS in the mid-1960s.

Early life

Rajendra Singh was born to Jwala Devi and Balbir Pratap Singh in a  Tomar Rajput family. He was born on 29 January in either 1921 or 1922 in village banail district buladshahar city of state Uttar Pradesh, when his father was posted there as an engineer. Originally his father Balbir Pratap Singh belonged to village Banail Pahasu of Bulandshahr district.

Singh matriculated from Unnao. After that he was enrolled at the Modern School, New Delhi for a brief period before moving to St Joseph's College, Nainital. Progressing to University of Allahabad, he obtained BSc, MSc and PhD degrees.

Academic career
Singh was acknowledged as an exceptionally brilliant student by Sir C. V. Raman, the physicist and Nobel Prize-winner, when he was his examiner in MSc He also offered Singh a fellowship for advanced research in nuclear physics.

He joined Allahabad University after majoring in Physics to teach Spectroscopy. He taught at the university for several years, where later he was appointed head of the Physics Department.

Singh was also considered an expert in nuclear physics which was very rare those days in India. He was a very popular teacher of the subject, using simple and clear concepts.

Association with RSS
Singh was active in the Quit India Movement of 1942 and it was during this time that he came in contact with the RSS. The Sangh influenced his life thereafter. He resigned from his university post in 1966 and offered full-time services to the RSS as a pracharak.

Beginning in Uttar Pradesh, Singh progressed to be the Sar-karyavaha (General Secretary) in the 1980s. In March 1994, Madhukar Dattatraya Deoras, the third chief of RSS, decided to retire on health grounds, becoming the first RSS chief ever to relinquish the post. He appointed Singh as his successor. Sheshadri was appointed second-in-charge, as Sarkaryawah.

While in Uttar Pradesh, Singh worked with Lal Bahadur Shastri, Chandra Shekhar and V.P. Singh.

Arguably Rajju Bhaiya's term of six years was one of the most crucial for both Sangh and India. Singh shared an excellent rapport with political leaders, cutting across ideological lines, as well as with academics, social workers and intellectuals.

1998 saw the pragmatic shift of Indian politics when the main opposition party, the Bharatiya Janata Party (BJP) emerged as the largest party in the ruling National Democratic Alliance (NDA) coalition at the centre. This was a crucial period for the RSS and its political wing BJP. The BJP and the RSS shared many common ideologies.

He gave up the post of Sarsanghchalak on account of his failing health in February 2000 and nominated K. S. Sudarshan as his successor.

During emergency he went underground and toured whole India. Singh was also responsible for organizing human rights convention presided by Justice V. M. Tarkunde in Delhi in 1976. He was also responsible for setting up friends of India Society International.

Ideology
One of the most important beliefs of Singh was: "All people are basically nice. One should deal with every person by believing in his goodness. Anger, jealousy, etc. are the offshoots of his past experiences, which affect his behavior. Primarily every person is nice and everyone is reliable."

Like other Sarsanghchalaks he was a firm believer in the concept of swadeshi and empowering rural economy. Initiating the rural developmental activities, he had declared in 1995 that the utmost priority should be given in making the villages hunger-free, disease-free and educative. Today, there are over 100 villages where the rural development work done by swayamsevaks has inspired the people of surrounding villages and their experiments are being emulated by those people.

Last days
Singh wanted to establish a memorial named after Ram Prasad Bismil in Delhi, the capital of India. He died on 14 July 2003 at Kaushik Ashram in Pune, Maharashtra, where he was spending his time after retirement. He was cremated at Pune's Vaikunth Crematorium the next day, like any commoner, in the presence of then RSS chief K. S. Sudarshan, and top BJP leaders including the then Prime Minister Atal Bihari Vajpayee, then Deputy Prime Minister L. K. Advani, and India's Vice President Bhairon Singh Shekhawat.

Posthumous recognition
 Prof. Rajendra Singh (Rajju Bhaiya) University in Prayagraj (Allahabad) is named after him.
 Prof. Rajendra Singh (Rajju Bhaiya) Institute of Physical Sciences for Study and Research at Veer Bahadur Singh Purvanchal University (Jaunpur) is named after him. (see also commemorative plaque shown on this page)

References

External links

 Obituary in the Independent 
 The complete swayamsevak - Govindacharya

Rashtriya Swayamsevak Sangh pracharaks
2003 deaths
1922 births
Sarsanghchalaks
People from Shahjahanpur